The Astronomical Almanac is an almanac published by the United States Naval Observatory (USNO) and His Majesty's Nautical Almanac Office (HMNAO); it also includes data supplied by many scientists from around the world. It is considered a worldwide resource for fundamental astronomical data, often being the first publication to incorporate new International Astronomical Union resolutions. The almanac largely contains Solar System ephemeris and catalogs of selected stellar and extragalactic objects.  The material appears in sections, each section addressing a specific astronomical category. The book also includes references to the material, explanations, and examples. It is available one year in advance of its date.

The Astronomical Almanac Online is a companion to the printed volume.  It is designed to broaden the scope of the publication, not duplicate the data.  In addition to ancillary information, the Astronomical Almanac Online extends the printed version by providing data best presented in machine-readable form.

Publication contents 

Section A PHENOMENA: includes information on the seasons, phases of the Moon, configurations of the planets, eclipses, transits of Mercury or Venus, sunrise/set, moonrise/set times, and times for twilight. Preprints of many of these data appear in Astronomical Phenomena, another joint publication by USNO and HMNAO.

Section B TIME-SCALES AND COORDINATE SYSTEMS: contains calendar information, relationships between time scales, universal and sidereal times, Earth rotation angle, definitions of the various celestial coordinate systems, frame bias, precession, nutation, obliquity, intermediate system, the position and velocity of the Earth, and coordinates of Polaris. Preprints of many of these data also appear in Astronomical Phenomena.

Section C SUN; covers detailed positional information on the Sun, including the ecliptic and equatorial coordinates, physical ephemerides, geocentric rectangular coordinates, times of transit, and the equation of time.

Section D MOON: contains detailed positional information on the Moon including phases, mean elements of the orbit and rotation, lengths of mean months, ecliptic and equatorial coordinates, librations, and physical ephemerides.

Section E PLANETS: consist of detailed positional information on each of the major planets including osculating orbital elements, heliocentric ecliptic and geocentric equatorial coordinates, and physical ephemerides.

Section F NATURAL SATELLITES; covers positional information on the satellites of Mars, Jupiter, Saturn (including the rings), Uranus, Neptune, and Pluto.

Section G DWARF PLANETS AND SMALL SOLAR SYSTEM BODIES: includes positional and physical data on selected dwarf planets, positional information on bright minor planets and periodic comets.

Section H STARS AND STELLAR SYSTEMS: contains mean places for bright stars, double stars, UBVRI standards, ubvy and H beta standards, spectrophotometric standards, radial velocity standards, variable stars, exoplanet and host stars, bright galaxies, open clusters, globular clusters, ICRF2 radio source positions, radio flux calibrators, x-ray sources, quasars, pulsars, and gamma ray sources.

Section J OBSERVATORIES: is a worldwide index of observatory names, locations, MPC codes, and instrumentation in alphabetical order and by country.

Section K TABLES AND DATA: includes Julian dates, selected astronomical constants, relations between time scales, coordinates of the celestial pole, reduction of terrestrial coordinates, interpolations methods, vectors and matrices.

Section L NOTES AND REFERENCES: gives notes on the data and references for source material found in the almanac.

Section M GLOSSARY: contains terms and definitions for many of the words and phrases, with emphasis on positional astronomy.

Publication history
The Astronomical Almanac is the direct descendant of the British and American navigational almanacs. The British Nautical Almanac and Astronomical Ephemeris had been published since 1766, and was renamed The Astronomical Ephemeris in 1960. The American Ephemeris and Nautical Almanac had been published since 1852. In 1981 the British and American publications were combined under the title The Astronomical Almanac."

Explanatory Supplement to the Astronomical Almanac

The Explanatory Supplement to the Astronomical Almanac, currently in its third edition (2013), provides detailed discussion of usage and data reduction methods used by the Astronomical Almanac. It covers its history, significance, sources, methods of computation, and use of the data. Because the Astronomical Almanac prints primarily positional data, this book goes into great detail on techniques to get astronomical positions. Earlier editions of the supplement were published in 1961 and in 1992.

See also 

 American Ephemeris and Nautical Almanac (specific title)
 Astronomical Ephemeris (generic article)
 Almanac (generic article)
 Nautical almanac (generic article)
 The Nautical Almanac (familiar name for a specific series of (official British) publications which appeared under a variety of different full titles for the period 1767 to 1959, as well as being a specific official title (jointly UK/US-published) for 1960 onwards)
 Jet Propulsion Laboratory Development Ephemeris (used by the Astronomical Almanac)

References

External links
 The Astronomical Almanac (official publication at U.S. Naval Observatory website)
 The Astronomical Almanac Online (official publication online at Her Majesty's Nautical Almanac Office website)

United States Naval Observatory
Astronomical almanacs
Astronomical catalogues